Gracemont is a microarchitecture for low-power processors used in systems on a chip (SoCs) made by Intel, and is the successor to Tremont. Like its predecessor, it is also implemented as low-power cores in a hybrid design of the Alder Lake and Raptor Lake processors.

Design 
Gracemont is the fourth generation out-of-order low-power Atom microarchitecture, built on the Intel 7 manufacturing process.

The Gracemont microarchitecture has the following enhancements over Tremont:

 Level 1 cache per core:
 eight-way-associative 64KB instruction cache  
 eight-way-associative 32KB data cache
 New On-Demand Instruction Length Decoder
 Instruction issue increased to five per clock (from four)
 Instruction retire increased to eight per clock (from seven)
 Execution ports (functional units) there are now 17 (from eight)
 Reorder buffer increased to 256 entries (from 208)
 Improved branch prediction
 Support for AVX, AVX2, FMA3 and AVX-VNNI instructions

Technology 
 System on a chip (SoC) architecture
 3D tri-gate transistors
 64KB L1 instruction cache, up from 32 KB in Tremont
 2 or 4MB shared L2 cache per 4-core module Alder Lake-S/H/P/U family has 2MB.  Raptor Lake-S/H/P/U family has 4MB.
 Intel Xe (Gen. 12.2) GPU with DirectX 12, OpenGL 4.6, Vulkan 1.3, OpenGL ES 3.2 and OpenCL 3.0 support.
 Thermal design power (TDP)
 10W desktop processors
 6W mobile processors

List of Gracemont processors 

The microarchitecture is used as the efficient cores of the 12th generation of Intel Core hybrid processors (codenamed "Alder Lake") and the 13th generation of Intel Core hybrid processors (codenamed "Raptor Lake"). It's used exclusively in the Alder Lake-N line-up.

Alder Lake-N 
List of Alder Lake-N processors as follows:

Processors for base transceiver stations (Grand Ridge)

See also
 List of Intel CPU microarchitectures

References

Intel x86 microprocessors
Intel microarchitectures
X86 microarchitectures